Tomasz Gapiński (born 8 July 1982 in Piła, Poland) is an international motorcycle speedway rider who rode in the 2007 Speedway Grand Prix of Europe. He won the Team Polish Champion titles in 1999 and 2006.

Speedway Grand Prix results

Career details

World Championships 
 Individual World Championship (Speedway Grand Prix)
 2006 - notclassify (0 heats in European SGP)
 2007 - 32nd place (1 point in European SGP)
 Individual U-21 World Championship

European Championships 
 Individual European Championship
 2005 -  Lonigo - 11th place (5 points)
 2008 - injury in before Semi-Final 3
 European Pairs Championship
 2004 -  Debrecen - Bronze medal (5 points)
 European Club Champions' Cup
 2007 -  Miskolc - Runner-up (10 points)

Polish competitions 
 Individual Polish Championship
 2008 - injur before Semi-Final 2
 2009 - 17th place in Quarter-Final 3
 Team Polish Championship
 1999 - Polish Champion
 2000 - Runner-up
 2004 - Runner-up
 2006 - Polish Champion
 2007 - Bronze medal
 Golden Helmet
 2004 -  Bydgoszcz - Runner-up
 2008 -  Rzeszów - injury before meeting
 Silver Helmet U-21
 2003 -  Bydgoszcz - Bronze medal
 Mieczysław Połukard Criterium of Polish Speedway Leagues Aces -  Bydgoszcz
 2006 - 10th place (7 points)

See also 
 Poland national speedway team
 List of Speedway Grand Prix riders

References 

1982 births
Living people
Polish speedway riders
People from Piła
Sportspeople from Greater Poland Voivodeship